Antonio Maramaldo (died 1514) was a Roman Catholic prelate who served as Bishop of Nusco (1485–1514).

Biography
On 21 Nov 1485, Antonio Maramaldo was appointed by Pope Innocent VIII as Bishop of Nusco.
He served as Bishop of Nusco until his death in 1514.

References

External links and additional sources
 (for Chronology of Bishops) 
 (for Chronology of Bishops) 

15th-century Italian Roman Catholic bishops
16th-century Italian Roman Catholic bishops
1514 deaths
Bishops appointed by Pope Innocent VIII